Merited Culture Worker of Ukraine is an honorary title of Ukraine awarded by the president of Ukraine under the Ukrainian law "On state Awards of Ukraine." According to the regulations of the honorary rank of Ukraine on June 29, 2001, the title is assigned to:

Persons represented to the award of the honorary title "Merited Culture Worker of Ukraine" should have higher education or professional technical school.

Laureates
 Tetiana Yakovenko (born 1954), poet, literary critic, teacher
 Nadiia Nikitenko (born 1944), historian, museologist
 Ihor Likhovy (born 1957), diplomat, museologist, historian, culturologist, former Minister of Culture and Tourism

References 
 Закон України № 1549-III від 16 березня 2000 року «Про державні нагороди України»
 Указ Президента України № 476/2001 від 29 червня 2001 року «Про почесні звання України»

See also

 List of European art awards

Ukrainian art awards
Ukrainian culture
Labor in Ukraine
Awards established in 2001
2001 establishments in Ukraine